Mitothemma is a genus of moths of the family Erebidae. The genus was erected by Arthur Gardiner Butler in 1883.

Species
Mitothemma acuminata Butler, 1883
Mitothemma angulipennis Butler, 1883
Mitothemma striata Butler, 1883

References

Calpinae